Thomas Joseph Hardiman (born August 2, 1947) is an American former handball player who competed in the 1972 Summer Olympics.

Born and raised in Trenton, New Jersey, he was part of the American team which finished 14th in the Olympic tournament at the 1972 Summer Olympics in Munich. He played one match.

He is a Minister at Morningstar Ministries.

References

External links
 profile

1947 births
Living people
American male handball players
Olympic handball players of the United States
Handball players at the 1972 Summer Olympics
Sportspeople from Trenton, New Jersey